"Halloween" is a poem written by the Scottish poet Robert Burns in 1785. First published in 1786, the poem is included in the Kilmarnock Edition. It is one of Burns' longer poems, with twenty-eight stanzas, and employs a mixture of Scots and English.

Background
The poet John Mayne from Dumfries, a comparatively obscure follower of the Scottish Muses, had attempted a poem on the subject of Halloween in 1780. Having twelve stanzas, the poem makes note of pranks at Halloween; "What fearfu' pranks ensue!", as well as the supernatural associated with the night, "Bogies" (ghosts). The poem appeared in Ruddimans Weekly Magazine, November 1780, published by Walter Ruddiman in Edinburgh. That the Ayrshire poet Burns actually saw and was influenced by Mayne's composition is apparent, as he appears to communicate with Mayne's work, and also echoes some of his imagery. According to Burns, Halloween is "thought to be a night when witches, devils, and other mischief-making beings are all abroad on their baneful midnight errands".

Notes

References

External links

Poems And Songs Of Robert Burns by Robert Burns

1785 poems
Poetry by Robert Burns
Narrative poems
Halloween fiction
1786 in Scotland